Barrettinelli di Fuori Lighthouse is a light situated on the granitic Barrettinelli rocks,  long and  wide, in the Maddalena archipelago at  east of Isola Santa Maria and  north of Isola Corcelli.

Description
The lighthouse is completely automated and managed by the Marina Militare with the identification code number 1010 E.F.

See also
 List of lighthouses in Italy

References

External links

 Servizio Fari Marina Militare 

Lighthouses in Italy
Lighthouses completed in 1961
Buildings and structures in the Province of Sassari
Lighthouses completed in 1936